United Front of Principlists (Jabhah-e Muttahid-e Uṣūlgarāyān) was an Iranian principlist political coalition that contested the 2008 and 2012 legislative elections.

Member groups

2008 
 Front of Followers of the Line of the Imam and the Leader
 Coalition of the Pleasant Scent of Servitude
Society of Devotees of the Islamic Revolution

2012 
 The Two Societies
 Combatant Clergy Association
 Society of Seminary Teachers of Qom 
 Front of Transformationalist Principlists
Society of Devotees of the Islamic Revolution 
Society of Pathseekers of the Islamic Revolution
 Front of Followers of the Line of the Imam and the Leader

Split groups 
 People's Voice
 Insight and Islamic Awakening Front

See also
Political parties in Iran

References

Defunct political party alliances in Iran
Electoral lists for Iranian legislative election, 2008
Electoral lists for Iranian legislative election, 2012
Principlist political groups in Iran